The 2009 Abierto Internacional Varonil Casablanca Cancún was a professional tennis tournament played on outdoor red clay courts. It was the second edition of the tournament which was part of the 2009 ATP Challenger Tour. It took place in Cancún, Mexico between 16 and 22 November 2009.

ATP entrants

Seeds

 Rankings are as of November 9, 2009.

Other entrants
The following players received wildcards into the singles main draw:
  Jordan Cox
  Daniel Garza
  Tigre Hank
  Bruno Rodríguez

The following players received entry from the qualifying draw:
  Adrien Bossel
  Philippe Frayssinoux
  Eric Nunez
  Greg Ouellette
  Pedro Sousa (LL)

Champions

Singles

 Nicolás Massú def.  Grega Žemlja, 6–3, 7–5

Doubles

 Andre Begemann /  Leonardo Tavares def.  Greg Ouellette /  Adil Shamasdin, 6–1, 6–7(6), [10–8]

External links
ITF search 
2009 Draws

Abierto Internacional Varonil Casablanca Cancun
Abierto Internacional Varonil Casablanca Cancún
Cancún
2009 in Mexican tennis